Cylindrocladiella elegans is an ascomycete fungus species in the genus Cylindrocladiella.

References

External links
 

Nectriaceae
Fungi described in 1993